Little Devil-May-Care (or  The Devil in the Heart) (French: Le Diable au cœur) is a 1928 French-British silent drama film directed by Marcel L'Herbier and starring Betty Balfour, Jaque Catelain and Roger Karl.

Plot
In a small coastal town Ludivine, a fisherman's daughter, falls in love with Delphin, an orphaned boy who comes to live with them. But her father wants her to marry Lauderin, the lecherous manager of a local cabaret-bar.

Cast
 Betty Balfour as Ludivine Bucaille 
 Jaque Catelain as Delphin Leherg  
 Roger Karl as Bucaille, Ludivine's father
 André Nox as Pierre Lauderin  
 Kissa Kouprine as Thania  
 Catherine Fonteney as Madame Bucaille, Ludivine's mother
 Magda Aranyi as Lauderin's stepmother
 Leo Da Costa as Gaston Lauderin  
 André Heuzé as André Bucaille  
 Auguste Picaude as Maurice Bucaille
 Falcau as Lauderin's brother
 Jane Pierson as a woman 
 Marie Glory as a young thief

Production
L'Herbier had originally made an agreement with the Gaumont-British company to film Labiche's stage farce Un chapeau de paille d'Italie with the popular English actress Betty Balfour. When that project was delayed, the filming rights were ceded to René Clair who was also eager to adapt the work, and L'Herbier proceeded with an alternative adaptation of a novel by Lucie Delarue-Mardrus set in a Breton fishing community.

Filming began, in November 1926, on location at Honfleur, and then at the Studios de la Villette in Paris and the Victorine Studios in Nice, but the production was beset with problems. Soon after filming began several leading members of the cast became ill, including Balfour, and the production had to be halted for a time, incurring greater costs. When they had resumed, the actor Auguste Mévisto, playing Ludivine's father, suddenly died, and several scenes had to be refilmed with his replacement Roger Karl. Further difficulties were caused by the panchromatic film which was being used for the first time in a French production, and technical inexperience with this filmstock produced a number of unforeseen problems. L'Herbier subsequently felt that, despite the film's appealing elements and the vivacious humour of Betty Balfour, the finished product lacked rigorous consistency.

The film's sets were designed by Claude Autant-Lara, Lucien Aguettand, and Robert-Jules Garnier.

Preservation
The film has been restored by the CNC Archives françaises du film, and a DVD was released with the book Marcel L'Herbier: l'art du cinéma in 2007.

References

External links

1928 drama films
French drama films
1928 films
Films directed by Marcel L'Herbier
French silent feature films
Films based on French novels
Seafaring films
Pathé films
French black-and-white films
Silent drama films
Silent adventure films
1920s French films